Senator Niles may refer to:

Dalwin J. Niles (1914–1979), New York State Senate
John Milton Niles (1787–1856), U.S. Senator from Connecticut from 1843 to 1849
Johnson Niles (1794–1872), Michigan State Senate